Tau  (uppercase Τ, lowercase τ, or) is the 19th letter of the Greek alphabet, representing the voiceless dental or alveolar plosive . In the system of Greek numerals, it has a value of 300.

Tau was derived from the Phoenician letter taw  (𐤕). Letters that arose from tau include Roman T and Cyrillic Te (Т, т).

The letter occupies the Unicode slots U+03C4 (lowercase) and U+03A4 (uppercase). In HTML, they can be produced with named entities (&tau; and &Tau;), decimal references (&#964; and &#932;), or hexadecimal references (&#x3C4; and &#x3A4;).

Modern usage 

The lower-case letter τ is used as a symbol for:
 Specific tax amount

Biology 
 The expressed period of the freerunning rhythm of an animal, i.e., the length of the daily cycle of an animal when kept in constant light or constant darkness
 The dose interval in pharmacokinetics
 The core variable in general tau theory
 Tau in biochemistry, a protein associated with microtubules and implicated in neurodegenerative diseases such as Alzheimer's disease, some forms of frontotemporal lobar degeneration, and chronic traumatic encephalopathy

Mathematics 
 Divisor function in number theory, also denoted d or σ0
 Golden ratio (1.618...), although φ (phi) is more common
 Kendall tau rank correlation coefficient in statistics
 Stopping time in stochastic processes.
 Tau, the ratio of the circumference to the radius of a circle, which is equal to 2 (6.28318...)
 Tau functions, several
 Torsion of a curve in differential geometry
 Translation in Euclidean geometry (although the Latin letter T is used more often)
 The Prouhet–Thue–Morse constant

Physics 
 Proper time in relativity
 Shear stress in continuum mechanics
 The lifetime of a spontaneous emission process
 Tau, an elementary particle in particle physics
 Tau in astronomy is a measure of optical depth, or how much sunlight cannot penetrate the atmosphere
 In the physical sciences, tau is sometimes used as time variable, to avoid confusing t as temperature
 Time constant (also relaxation time) of any system, such as an RC circuit
 Torque, the rotational force in mechanics
 The symbol for tortuosity in hydrogeology

Symbolism 
 In ancient times, tau was used as a symbol for life or resurrection, whereas the eighth letter of the Greek alphabet, theta, was considered the symbol of death.
 In Biblical times, the taw was put on men to distinguish those who lamented sin, although newer versions of the Bible have replaced the ancient term taw with mark (Ezekiel 9:4) or signature (Job 31:35). Its original sound value is a voiceless alveolar plosive, IPA /t/
 The symbolism of the cross was connected not only to the letter chi but also to tau, the equivalent of the last letter in the Phoenician and Old Hebrew alphabets, and which was originally cruciform in shape; see Cross of Tau.
 An essay written around 160 AD, attributed to Lucian, a mock legal prosecution called The Consonants at Law - Sigma vs. Tau, in the Court of the Seven Vowels, contains a reference to the cross attribution. Sigma petitions the court to sentence Tau to death by crucifixion, saying:
 Men weep, and bewail their lot, and curse Cadmus with many curses for introducing Tau into the family of letters; they say it was his body that tyrants took for a model, his shape that they imitated, when they set up structures on which men are crucified. Stauros (cross) the vile engine is called, and it derives its vile name from him. Now, with all these crimes upon him, does he not deserve death, nay, many deaths? For my part I know none bad enough but that supplied by his own shape — that shape which he gave to the gibbet named stauros after him by men
 Tau is usually considered as the symbol of Franciscan orders due to St. Francis' love for it, symbol of the redemption and of the Cross. Almost all Franciscan churches have painted a tau with two crossing arms, both with stigmata, the one of Jesus and the other of Francis; members of the Secular Franciscan Order usually wear a wooden τ in a string with three knots around the neck
 The title and symbol of "Tau" is used by neo-Gnostic bishops as it has some symbolism in many of the modern branches of Gnosticism.

Character encodings
For the Greek and Coptic letter tau:

For the mathematical letter tau:

These characters are used only as mathematical symbols. Stylized Greek text should be encoded using the normal Greek letters, with markup and formatting to indicate text style.

See also 

 Greek letters used in mathematics, science, and engineering

Notes

References 

Greek letters
Cross symbols